Tory Island Cattle are a rare breed of cattle from Tory Island in County Donegal, Ireland.

References 

Cattle breeds
Cattle breeds originating in Ireland